, provisional designation , is a sub-kilometer near-Earth asteroid and a potentially hazardous object of the Apollo group. It was discovered by astronomers of the LINEAR program at the Lincoln Laboratory's Experimental Test Site near Socorro, New Mexico.  is a contact binary object consisting of two distinct lobes, as seen in radar images from various observatories including Arecibo and Goldstone in January 2015.

Close approaches 

During the encounter,  was observed by radar from the Arecibo, Green Bank, and Goldstone observatories.

The Minor Planet Center has classified  as a potentially hazardous asteroid due to its large size and small Earth minimum orbit intersection distance (MOID) of 0.03 AU.

Physical characteristics 
 was discovered in May 1999 by the Lincoln Near-Earth Asteroid Research (LINEAR) program at the Lincoln Laboratory's Experimental Test Site near Socorro, New Mexico. Most properties of  have been determined through photometry, spectroscopy, infrared radiometry, and radar imaging.

Binzel et al. (2001) have found that  has a spectral class of an Xk-type asteroid. Thermal infrared observations using the WISE spacecraft by Mainzer et al. (2011) and the Spitzer Space Telescope by Mueller et al. Warner et al. (2014, 2015) suggest that  has a highly elongated shape due to its large light curve amplitude of 0.9 magnitudes. Based on 's large brightness changes, they measured a rotation period of 6.54 hours. In January 2015, radar imaging by the Arecibo Observatory and the Green Bank Observatory confirmed 's elongated shape and provided delay-Doppler images used to obtain a preliminary estimate of a 3D model for its shape. The radar data reveal an apparent concavity and suggest that  is a contact binary.

References

External links 
 Goldstone Radar Observations Planning: 1999 JV6, 2001 WL15, and Toro, JPL Asteroid Radar Research
 3D model of the asteroid
 
 
 

085990
085990
085990
085990
085990
Astronomical objects discovered in 1999